In rocketry, the Armadillo Aerospace Quad vehicle called Pixel is a computer-controlled VTVL rocket that was used in 2006 to compete in the Lunar Lander Challenge.

General description
The quad vehicle design is a pressure fed in blow-down mode from an initial pressure of 320 psi for level 1 (400 psi level 2). The cold gas vernier engines are cross-fed by gas drawn from ullage space of the opposite tank. The vehicle was able to transfer propellant through connecting pipes between opposite tanks by controlling ullage pressures with the thrusters; this helps it balance, minimizing gas use. The main engine had two-axis thrust vectoring. The vehicle was fully computer controlled; with guidance from GPS and fiber optic gyros.

Specification
The specification for Pixel/Texel for level 1:

 Width: ~1.9 m (~75 inches)
 Height: ~1.9 m (~75 inches)
 Dry Weight: 650 pounds
 Gross Lift Off Weight (GLOW): ~1500 pounds (360 pounds ethanol, ~500 LOX)
 Payload: 55 pounds
 Engines: 1 (+ 4 cold gas attitude jets)
 Thrust (sl): ~3000 pounds

Engine (XPC-06):

 Thrust: ~3000 pounds (throttleable to 25%)
 Chamber Pressure: 300 psi
 Nozzle Area Ratio: 2:1
 Isp (sl): ~140-~200 seconds (low-high throttle)
 Length: 0.51 m (20 inches)
 Diameter: 0.2 m (8 inches)
 Chamber: carbon fiber reinforced graphite built by Cesaroni aerospace
 Burn Time: >100 seconds, expected >180 for level 2, with approximately double the propellant mass.

Purchase by NASA
On 8 March 2010, Matthew Ross of Armadillo Aerospace confirmed that Pixel had been converted to methane/LOX propellant and sold to NASA as part of the Project M testbed for the Autonomous Landing Hazard Avoidance Technology (ALHAT) LIDAR range finding system under development by Jet Propulsion Laboratory (JPL).

See also

 Reusable Vehicle Testing program of the Japanese Space Agency JAXA
 Project Morpheus NASA program to continue developing ALHAT and Quad landers
 Blue Origin New Shepard
 Kankoh-maru
 McDonnell Douglas DC-X
 Zarya
 CORONA
 Grasshopper

References

Reusable launch systems
Rockets and missiles
Pressure-fed rockets
VTVL rockets